Daniel Fred Kidega is a Ugandan politician and former Speaker of the East African Legislative Assembly, in office from December 2014 until June 2017. As of August  2020, he served as the chairman of Atiak Sugar Factory, in Amuru District, in which the Uganda government owned 40 percent shareholding.

Early life and education
He was born at St. Mary's Hospital Lacor, in Gulu City on 10 December 1973. He attended Christ the King Demonstration School in Gulu for his elementary schooling. His father, Dusman Okee Sr. (5 January 1942 – 3 January 2016), is also the father of Norbert Mao. He transferred to Ntare School in Mbarara for his high school education. He studied at Kyambogo University, at that time called Kyambogo Polytechnic. He graduated from Kyambogo with a Diploma in Biochemistry. He then joined Uganda Christian University in Mukono, graduating with a Bachelor of Business Administration degree. Later, he studied at Lund University in Lund, Sweden, obtaining a Diploma in International Trade and a Master of Science in International Trade.

Career
Kidega was a student leader in the 1990s, rising to the rank of Chairman of the National Youth Council. He worked as the Private Secretary to the Vice President of Uganda from 2000 to 2001. Daniel Fred Kidega was a member of President Museveni's national campaign taskforce in 2001. He served as a Member of Parliament in the Seventh Parliament from 2001 until 2006, as a National Youth Representative. He is a member of the National Executive Council (NEC), the highest organ of the ruling National Resistance Movement political party. He was a member of President Museveni's national campaign team in 2011. He was first elected to the EALA in 2007 and was re-elected for a second term in 2012.

On 19 December 2014 he was elected unopposed as the fourth Speaker of the East African Legislative Assembly, replacing Margaret Zziwa of Uganda, who was impeached by the Assembly for "alleged impunity, incompetence, intimidation of members, among other reasons". He served the remainder of his predecessor's term until June 2017.

See also
East African Community
Parliament of Uganda
Nusura Tiperu

References

Living people
1973 births
Acholi people
People from Northern Region, Uganda
Ugandan politicians
Ugandan Christians
Uganda Christian University alumni
Lund University alumni
People from Gulu District
Kyambogo University alumni
People educated at Ntare School
Members of the East African Legislative Assembly